Iolaus mermeros is a butterfly in the family Lycaenidae. It is found on Madagascar. The habitat consists of forests.

Gallery

References

External links

Images representing Iolaus mermeros at Barcodes of Life
Die Gross-Schmetterlinge der Erde 13: Die Afrikanischen Tagfalter. Plate XIII 67 c

Butterflies described in 1878
Iolaus (butterfly)
Endemic fauna of Madagascar
Butterflies of Africa
Taxa named by Paul Mabille